Hodnet is a civil parish in Shropshire, England.  It contains 59 listed buildings that are recorded in the National Heritage List for England.  Of these, two are listed at Grade I, the highest of the three grades, five are at Grade II*, the middle grade, and the others are at Grade II, the lowest grade. The parish contains the villages of Hodnet, Peplow, and Wollerton, and smaller settlements, and is otherwise mainly rural.  The oldest building in the parish is the 12th-century St Luke's Church, which is listed, together with its lychgate.  In the parish are two country houses that are listed, with associated structures.  Most of the other listed buildings are houses, cottages, farmhouses and farm buildings, many of which are timber framed and date from the 15th to the 18th centuries.  Also listed are an animal pound, three mileposts, another church, and a telephone kiosk.


Key

Buildings

References

Citations

Sources

Lists of buildings and structures in Shropshire